Phuntsog Namgyal II was the fifth Chogyal (king) of Sikkim. He succeeded Gyurmed Namgyal in 1733 and was succeeded himself by Tenzing Namgyal in 1780.

During his reign the Nepalese raided Rabdentse, the then capital of Sikkim.

References

External links
History of Sikkim

1733 births
1780 deaths
Monarchs of Sikkim